This list shows an overview of postal code notation schemes for all countries that have postal or ZIP Code systems.

List 

 Legend
 A = letter
 N = number
 ? = letter or number
 CC = ISO 3166-1 alpha-2 country code

On the use of country codes
The use of the country codes in conjunction with postal codes started as a recommendation from CEPT (European Conference of Postal and Telecommunications Administrations) in the 1960s. In the original CEPT recommendation the distinguishing signs of motor vehicles in international traffic ("car codes") were placed before the postal code, and separated from it by a "-" (dash). Codes were only used on international mail and were hardly ever used internally in each country.

Since the late 1980s, however, a number of postal administrations have changed the recommended codes to the two-letter country codes of ISO 3166. This would allow a universal, standardized code set to be used, and bring it in line with country codes used elsewhere in the UPU (Universal Postal Union). Attempts were also made (without success) to make this part of the official address guidelines of the UPU. Recently introduced postal code systems where the UPU has been involved have included the ISO 3166 country code as an integral part of the postal code.

At present there are no universal guidelines as to which code set to use, and recommendations vary from country to country. In some cases, the applied country code will differ according to recommendations of the sender's postal administration. UPU recommends that the country name always be included as the last line of the address.

In the list above, the following principles have been applied:

 Integral country codes have been included in the code format, in bold type and without brackets. These are also used on internal mail in the respective countries.
 The ISO 3166 codes is used alone for countries that have explicitly recommended them.
 Where there is no explicit recommendation for ISO 3166 codes and the codes differ, both "car codes" and ISO 3166 codes are listed, with the "car code" listed first.

See also
 Universal Postal Union
 International Postcode system using Cubic Meters (CubicPostcode.com)
 International Postcodes database (mapanet.eu)

References

Footnotes

Notations
 Updated!

Postal codes, List of
Postal codes L
Lists by country